SAP Mobile Platform (formerly Sybase Unwired Platform) is a mobile enterprise application platform designed to simplify the task of creating applications that connect business data to mobile devices for workflow management and back-office integration. SAP Mobile Platform provides a layer of middleware between heterogeneous back-end data sources, such as relational databases, enterprise applications and files, and the mobile devices that need to read and write back-end data.

Application developers write the business logic of a mobile application using the development tools in SAP Mobile Platform. The product automatically does the translation required to create customized versions of the new application for a wide variety of mobile devices and operating systems. The intent is to make it easier and faster to create complex applications that use multiple data sources and will work on many different mobile devices.

History
Sybase first released Sybase Unwired Platform in 2008. Written in C and Java.  Version 2.3 of the product was the first to be released as SAP Mobile Platform.

 Version 3.0: Released May 2014
 Version 2.3: Released end of 2013 as SAP Mobile Platform
 Version 2.2: Released in March 2013
 Version 2.1.3: Released in May 2012
 Version 2.1.2: Released February 2012
 Version 2.1.1: Released November 2011
 Version 2.1: Released September 2011
 Version 2.0: Released 2011
 Version 1.5.2: Released 2010
 Version 1.2: Released 2009
 Version 1.0: Released 2008

Features
 Appcelerator
 Cordova support
 Mobile Analytics Kit (MAKit)
 Mobile SDK
 Hybrid Web Container
 4GL tooling environment
Eclipse plug-in
 Integrated mobile device management and application enablement
 Support for multiple device types, including Android, iOS, BlackBerry, Windows Mobile, and Windows laptops/tablets.
 Integrates with SAP, Remedy Corp, and other applications that leverage databases or service oriented architecture.
 Unwired Platform Runtime
 Secure access between mobile devices and a network

Usage
To use Sybase Unwired Platform, a software developer drags and drops table names from a database list into a diagram, which creates what the product calls a "mobile business object." The Sybase Unwired Platform server uses that object to determine how data will be shared between the server and mobile clients, and then performs "code generation" to create customized versions for individual mobile platforms.

Competitors
Tokn: builds integrated enterprise apps for any system such as SAP, Oracle, IFS, SQL with all apps run native on Android, Microsoft and IOS.
Syclo: Following SAP's acquisition, Syclo's Agentry solution became part of SAP Mobile Platform in its 2.3 release.
KonyOne Platform
Verivo
Convertigo
Nitro Mobile Solutions
Appcelerator

See also
Mobile application management
Mobile device
Mobile device management
Mobile enterprise application platform
Cross-platform software
Unwired enterprise
Sybase

References

Sujoy Sameer Das, Bosch

Mobile business software